

Yearly events 
State Championships
State League

State teams 
The New South Wales Softball Association attends all ASF National Championships

For the 2006 Championships the following was entered:
Under 16 Girls
Under 16 Boys
Under 19 Women's
Under 19 Men's
Under 23 Women's
Under 23 Men's
Open Women's
Open Men's

Associations 

Campbelltown & District Softball Association
Division:	Southern Metropolitan
Website:	http://www.campbelltown.softball.net.au
Grounds:	Milton park	

Central Coast Softball Association
Division:	Northern Metropolitan
Website:	http://www.centralcoast.softball.net.au
Grounds:	Tuggerah Oval
	
Cumberland Nepean Softball Association
Division	Northern Metropolitan
Website:	http://www.cumberland.softball.net.au
Grounds:	International Peace Park & Stanhope Gardens
	
Georges River Softball Association
Division	Southern Metropolitan
Website	http://www.georgesriver.softball.net.au
Ground	Kelso Park Softball Complex
	
Hawkesbury Softball Association
Division	Northern Metropolitan
Website	http://www.hawkesbury.softball.net.au
	
Hornsby District Softball Association
Division	Northern Metropolitan
Website	http://www.hornsby.softball.net.au
Ground	Hayes Park, Galston
	
Illawarra District Softball Association
Division	Southern Metropolitan
Website	http://www.illawarra.softball.net.au
Ground	Albion Park Oval, Albion Park Rail & Reed Park, Dapto
	
Softball Macarthur
Division	Southern Metropolitan
Website	http://www.macarthur.softball.net.au
Ground	Cowpasture Reserve, Argyle Street, Camden
	
Manly Warringah Softball Association
Division	Northern Metropolitan
Website	http://www.mwsa.com.au
Ground	Abbot Road, Harbord
	
Newcastle & District Softball Association
Division	Northern Metropolitan
Website	http://www.newcastle.softball.net.au
Ground	Stevenson Park, Stevenson Ave, Mayfield West
	
North Shore District Softball Association
Division	Northern Metropolitan
Website	http://www.northshore.softball.net.au
Ground	William Cowan Oval, St Ives Village Green, Bryce Oval, St Ives
	
Penrith City Softball Association
Division	Southern Metropolitan
Website	http://www.penrith.softball.net.au
Ground	Surveyors Creek Softball Facility, Glenmore Park
	
Southern Districts Softball Association
Division	Southern Metropolitan
Website	http://www.southerndistrictsnsw.softball.net.au
Ground	Jacquie Osmond Softball Centre
	
Sutherland Shire Softball Association
Division	Southern Metropolitan
Website	http://www.sutherland.softball.net.au
Ground	Captain Cook Reserve, Woolooware
	
Country Affiliates 

Camden Haven/Port Macquarie Softball Association
Division	Northern Country
Ground	Finlay Park, Port Macquarie
	
Coffs Harbour Softball Association
Division	Northern Country
Ground	Rugby Park, Toormina
	
Far North Coast Softball Association
Division	Northern Country
Website	http://www.fnc.softball.net.au 
Ground	Albert Park
	
Inverell Softball Association
Division	Northern Country
Ground	McIntrye Park, Inverell
	
Lower Clarence Softball Association
Division	Northern Country
Ground	Wherett Park, Maclean
	
Macleay Valley Softball Association
Division	Northern Country
Ground	Kemp Street Fields, Kempsey
	
Manning River Softball Association
Division              Northern Country

Mudgee Softball Association
Division	Southern Country
Website	http://www.mudgee.softball.net.au 
Ground	Mudgee
	
Orange & District Softball Association
Division	Southern Country
Website	http://www.orange.softball.net.au 
Ground	Sir Jack Brabham Park, Orange
	
Singleton Softball Association
Division	Northern Country
Ground	Rose Point Park, Singleton
	
Southern Highlands Softball Association
Division	Southern Country
Ground	OLSH, Centennial Rd, Bowral
	
Tamworth Softball Association
Division	Northern Country
Website	http://www.tamworth.softball.net.au 
Ground	Riverside Park, Carter Street, Tamworth
	
Tweed District Softball Association
Division	Northern Country
Website	http://www.tweed.softball.net.au 
Ground	Piggabeen Regional Sports Complex
	
Wagga Wagga Softball Association
Division	Southern Country
Website	http://www.waggawagga.softball.net.au 
Ground	French Fields, Walteela Avenue

See also 
Australian Softball Federation
ASF National Championships

External links 
New South Wales Softball Association inc.
Australian Softball Federation
International Softball Federation

Softball governing bodies in Australia
Sof